The canton of Rethel is an administrative division of the Ardennes department, northern France. Its borders were modified at the French canton reorganisation which came into effect in March 2015. Its seat is in Rethel.

It consists of the following communes:

Acy-Romance
Amagne
Ambly-Fleury
Arnicourt
Barby
Bertoncourt
Biermes
Corny-Machéroménil
Coucy
Doux
Mont-Laurent
Nanteuil-sur-Aisne
Novy-Chevrières
Rethel
Sault-lès-Rethel
Seuil
Sorbon
Thugny-Trugny

References

Cantons of Ardennes (department)